Vampirella is a fictional vampire superheroine created by Forrest J Ackerman and comic book artist Trina Robbins in Warren Publishing's black-and-white horror comics magazine Vampirella #1 (Sept. 1969), a sister publication of Creepy and Eerie.

Writer-editor Archie Goodwin later developed the character from horror-story hostesses, in which capacity she remained through issue #8 (Nov. 1970), to a horror-drama leading character. The magazine was published continuously until 1983, when Warren Publishing ceased operations and its assets were bought by Harris Publications. Vampirella comics, both new and reprints, have continued through various publishers into the 21st century.

Publication history

Warren Publishing
Vampirella initially appeared in Warren Publishing's black-and-white horror-comics magazine Vampirella #1 (Sept. 1969), running to issue #112 (March 1983), plus a 1972 annual reprinting stories from the series, and a 1977 special with color reprints of José González stories. The title was a sister magazine of Warren's horror anthologies Creepy and Eerie. Like those magazines' respective mascots, Uncle Creepy and Cousin Eerie, Vampirella hosted horror stories, though unlike them, she would also star in her own story, which would headline each issue. Vampirella was initially edited by Bill Parente. It would later be edited by Archie Goodwin (issues #7–12, 34–35), Billy Graham (#13–16), Bill DuBay (#21–50, 87–95, 101–102) and Louise Jones (#51–86).

According to comics historian Richard J. Arndt, "Forrest Ackerman created, or at least had a strong hand in creating, Vampirella and he clearly had a major influence in shaping the lighthearted bad-girl story style of this issue as well." Her costume and hair style were designed by comics artist Trina Robbins. The character's first story artist was Tom Sutton. Artist Frank Frazetta's first-issue cover was a substitute for the original cover by European artist Aslan.

José González became the character's primary artist starting with issue #12. Other artists who would draw Vampirella during her magazine's original run included Gonzalo Mayo, Leopold Sanchez, Esteban Maroto, José Ortiz, Escolano, Rudy Nebres, Ramon Torrents, Pablo Marcos, Jim Janes, John Lakey, Val Lakey, and Louis Small Jr.

Backup features appearing in Vampirella included "Tomb of the Gods", "Pantha" and "Fleur". Vampirella herself also appeared in a story with fellow Warren characters Pantha and the Rook in Eerie #94–95, and with most of the Warren characters in a company crossover special in Eerie #130.

Harris Publications
Upon Warren's bankruptcy shortly afterward, Harris Publications acquired the company assets at auction in August 1983, although legal murkiness and a 1999 lawsuit by Warren publisher James Warren resulted in his reacquisition of the rights to sister publications Creepy and Eerie. Harris Comics published Vampirella stories in various series and miniseries from 1991 to 2007, beginning with Vampirella #113 (1988), a one-issue continuation of the original series, containing Vampirella reprints and one unrelated new story. Harris subsequently published the all-reprint one-shot Vampirella vs. the Cult of Chaos, and the four-issue miniseries Vampirella: Morning in America (Sept. 1991 - April 1992) by writer Kurt Busiek and penciler Louis La Chance. Three ongoing series followed: 
 Vampirella #1-5, followed by #0 (Nov. 1992 - Dec. 1994), primarily by plotter Busiek, scriptwriter Tom Sniegoski, and penciler Louis Small Jr.; 
 Vengeance of Vampirella #1-25 (April 1994 - April 1996) by writer Sniegoski and artist Aldrin Aw (under the pseudonym Buzz), and later pencilers including Kirk Van Wormer, Kevin Sharpe, David Perrin, Chris Batista, and Amanda Conner. 
 Vampirella Strikes #1-7 (Oct. 1995 - Oct. 1996) by writers Sniegoski, David Quinn, Mark Millar, and Ian Edginton, and pencilers including Ed McGuinness, Karl Moline, and Rudy Nebres.

The three-issue miniseries Vampirella Lives (Dec. 1996 - Feb. 1997) featured writer Warren Ellis and penciler Conner.

Additionally, Harris published several one-shots: Vampirella Summer Nights (title per its trademarked cover logo) / Vampirella's Summer Nights (as in the indicia's copyright information) (1992), by writer Steve Englehart and penciler Joe Brozowski (under the pseudonym J. J. Birch), Vampirella/Shadowhawk: Creatures of the Night (Feb. 1995), Vampirella Pin-Up Special (Oct. 1995), and Vengeance of Vampirella: The Mystery Walk (Nov. 1995).

Harris also reprinted much material. The 1993 trade-paperback collection Vampirella: The Dracula War reprinted a serialized story from Harris' Vampirella #1-4. The 1994 Cain / Vampirella Flip Book reprinted a 1993 Vampirella story by writer Busiek and artist Arthur Adams from Harris' Creepy 1993 Fearbook. The five-issue Vampirella Classic (Feb.-Nov. 1995) reprinted Warren stories. Vengeance of Vampirella: Bloodshed (March 1995) reprinted a serialized story from the Vengeance of Vampirella series.

The publisher additionally reprinted Warren stories in the trade-paperback Vampirella: Transcending Time & Space, (1992) Vampirella: A Scarlet Thirst (1993), and Vampirella & The Blood Red Queen of Hearts (Sept. 1996); and the series Vampirella of Drakulon #1-5, followed by #0 (Jan.-Nov. 1996).

At the Fangoria Weekend of Horrors convention in January 2007, Scott Licina, editor-in-chief of Fangoria Comics, announced his company had acquired the character from Harris. However, on April 30, 2007, Harris editor Bon Alimagno denied there had been such an arrangement in place and that Fangoria's claim was "not factual". Harris subsequently launched the title Vampirella Quarterly.

Dynamite Entertainment
On March 17, 2010, Dynamite Entertainment acquired the rights to Vampirella from Harris Comics. The publisher started a new ongoing series with Vampirella #1, in November 2010. A new monthly series, Vampirella and the Scarlet Legion, was released in May 2011 following the main title. The series lasted 38 issues before concluding in January 2014.

The title was rebooted in June 2014 with Vampirella vol. 2, #1 by author Nancy Collins. The 2014 series would continue with Volume 3 in March 2016, which was noted for giving Vampirella a new costume.

A second reboot and fourth relaunch overall, Vampirella vol. 4, began in 2017. The series was first written by Paul Cornell, and later by Jeremy Whitley.

A fifth relaunch, written by Christopher Priest and Ergun Gündüz, began publication in July 2019 and commemorated the character's 50th anniversary. The run lasted 25 issues long and ended with Vampirella's marriage to Dracula, spinning off into a new series in 2021 titled Vampirella/Dracula: Unholy! Vampirella: Year One, a series following Vampirella's first year on Earth, premiered in July 2022.

In 2019, Dynamite also revived the series Vengeance of Vampirella, which had been the name of a Harris-era comic, and hired the original writer of that series, Thomas Sniegoski, to write a continuation of the original series. A sequel called Vampirella Strikes has been announced for May 2022.Also in May 2022 a one-shot fairy tale reimagining Vampirella as Red Riding hood would be released in August 2022. 

Vampirella appears in the 2020 crossover series Die!namite, which depicts her as an ambassador attempting to reach the new Drakulon colony. She has appeared in the sequels of Die!namite called Die!namite Lives and Die!namite Never Dies!.That year another crossover called Project Superpower:Dark power and a sequel will be released called Vampirella vs Red Sonja . 

She fought Purgatori in Vampirella vs Purgatori (2020), leading into Purgatori's own comic series in 2021.

Sniegoski, alongside Jeannine S. Acheson, launched a 2021 Vampirella multiverse comic called Vampiverse, in which Vampirella must figure out what's killing all the other Vampirellas.A oneshot spinoff following one of the Vampirellas called The Vamp was released in June 2022.

Announced in June 2022 Vampirella: Mindwarp wa, will feature Vampirella has she is thrown back into the 1970s by trading minds with her younger self

Announce in February 2023, Vampirella will once again face off with the Superpowers in Vampirella versus  Superpowers. It will come out in May. In this series she will have a sidekick called Dyna Might. The series will replace Priest 's Vampirella series until it's ended.

Mike The Pike Productions

On March 2, 2021, Mike The Pike Productions, Inc.'s subsidiary Arowana Media Holdings, Inc. acquired the worldwide film, television and streaming rights to Dynamite Entertainment's Vampirella. Including stories, characters, and derivative works of the Vampirella universe.

Fictional character biography

Vampirella originally hails from the planet Drakulon, a world where blood flows like water and where the natives, called the Vampiri, share traditionally vampiric characteristics. Drakulon orbits a binary star which causes continuous droughts throughout the year. These droughts gradually dry up the Vampiri's blood supply; threatening them with extinction. Vampirella's journey begins when an American space shuttle crashes on Drakulon. Hoping to save her people, she travels to Earth and begins hunting dark remnants of her own race. Earth's vampires originate from Dracula, a forgotten member of the Vampiri race who left his homeworld centuries ago only to be corrupted by the demonic entity known as Chaos.

Harris continuity
After relaunching Vampirella with the miniseries Morning In America, written by Kurt Busiek, Harris Comics published the story "Mystery Walk", which revised Vampirella's origin. She learns she is, in fact, the daughter of Lilith, whom popular medieval Jewish lore depicts as the first wife of Adam. Lilith would not submit to Adam and, cast out of Eden by God, spawned demons. She later repented and went to Eden to bear children to fight the evil she had created. Her first attempt was Madek and Magdalene, who turned to evil; Vampirella was her second. Madek and Magdalene brainwashed her into believing she was from Drakulon.

Further retcons were presented in Vampirella Lives and in Blood Lust. Drakulon is real, but is a place in Hell. Vampirella was brought to Eden, not born there. It was Lilith, not Madek and Magdalene, who made believe Drakulon was another planet. Vampirella restores the rivers of blood to Drakulon, which weakens Lilith, who is killed by the hand of God.

A further revision in the "World's End" storyline revealed Lilith did not really repent and raised Vampirella to be good because she wanted to release the Heart of Darkness (heart of the fallen angel Malkuth) from Metatron's lance, which could only be done by a good person. Another retcon, in Vampirella: Revelations, reveals the reason Lilith raised Vampirella to be good was that the existence of vampires made Lilith weaker and she wanted someone to kill them. Lilith used a magic mirror to make Vampirella believe whatever variation on her origin was necessary at the time.

Dynamite continuities
In the initial Dynamite-published series, Vampirella works reluctantly with Dracula against a rebellious cult of his former followers. Acquiring Sofia Murray as her sidekick, Vampirella becomes involved in a plot by the Vatican that ultimately resurrects Von Kreist and leads to Sofia's death. Vampirella severs her ties with the Vatican and finds herself working for the forces of Order again. Reuniting with a resurrected Van Helsing, Pendragon, and other characters from the Warren Magazine run, Vampirella visits the future and discovers the world destroyed by the supernatural. Trying to form a supernatural kingdom to contradict this, Vampirella falls prey to a conspiracy by Dracula and a group of vampire knights that result in reality becoming unraveled. Lilith banishes Vampirella from her universe in order to save her.

Vampirella was relaunched with Our Lady Of Shadows as an agent of the Vatican before being relaunched again with a new costume in Hollywood Horror under author Kate Leth. In this universe, Vampirella has recently come to Earth and become a Hollywood scream queen. She lives with her live-in boyfriend Tristan and butler Coleridge.

After falling into a thousand-year sleep, Vampirella awakes in a bizarre, dystopian future, where she meets her new sidekick and girlfriend, Vicki, and a black cat she names Grit. After going on a journey through her own mind, Vampirella learns she has absorbed all the memories and experiences of a hundred Vampirellas from parallel universes.

According to the Hack/Slash series, Vampirella currently works as a radio talk show host and has several times teamed up with Cassie and her partner Vlad to stop demons and vampires instead of the standard slashers the series is known for. She and Vlad have an intense physical attraction and relationship, but broke up because his nomadic lifestyle did not mesh with hers.

In the 2019 version by Christopher Priest, the writer incorporated all the previous versions of the character's history to make a comprehensive revision of Vampirella's back story. Vampirella has been on Earth for 50 years, and Draklon is an alternate version of Earth's moon. The alternate version of Earth is called Arcadia. We learn that Drakulon and Arcadia were at war which caused Aracadia to die out and Drakulon became an archaic society.

Powers and abilities
Vampirella possesses many of the typical powers of mythological vampires. She exerts super-strength when facing her opponents and can move so fast that she appears as a blur of motion.  Her senses are far beyond those of humans, allowing her to tell one's emotional state through their scent, hear things imperceptible to humans, and see clearly in total darkness.
She is very athletic, possessing great stamina, reflexes, and agility beyond that of humans. Her healing factor grants her great resilience and allows her to heal rapidly from her wounds and makes her immune to Earthly illness and toxins.

Whether she is able to turn other people into vampires is inconsistent. It was a plot point in the Warren era that she could not because she was a being from another planet and not a supernatural creature, but that origin was since revised and she could do it in the Shadowhawk crossover. However, that crossover is out of continuity for Shadowhawk and may be out of continuity for Vampirella.

She had the power to grow a giant pair of chiropteran wings to allow self-propelled flight. Her stare and even voice are hypnotic and seductive to humans, particularly males (she has been seen as having the ability to induce sexual arousal in men simply by being in their presence). She is shown to have the power of telepathy as she was able to hear the voices of demons inside Jackie Estacado's mind.

She is immortal.

In addition to her supernatural abilities, Vampirella is a formidable hand-to-hand combatant and is shown to be skilled with modern-day firearms.

Spinoffs
Christopher Priest's world of Vampirella has been expanded in spinoffs. The first is Sacred Six (2020), which follows Lilith, Vampirella's mother, protecting a vampire city with a team consisting of Nyx, Chasity, Pantha, Victory (who takes on the name Draculina), and Katie (the real Draculina). Solo series were published for Nyx (2021), Pantha (2022), and Draculina (2022). 

A sequel spin off was announced in November 2022 called Blood Simple taking place after the events of the first Draculina comic.

Characters

Main protagonists
 Vampirella
The heroine is a vampire, since she is the daughter of Lilith and needs blood to survive and has many of the typical vampiric powers, including superhuman physical abilities, shapeshifting into a bat, immortality, and a mesmeric stare. She is not prone to the race's traditional weaknesses, such as daylight, holy water, garlic, or crosses. She does not attack people to drink their blood, except occasionally when she herself is attacked or desires to kill.

Pendragon
A former sorcerer, now a sideshow magician. Vampirella calls him "Pendy dearest" and treats him as she would a kindly old uncle. While occasionally his knowledge of magic is useful to her, Pendragon is often a liability. In the Warren stories they often travel together, seeking out evil-doers, but Pendragon is generally depicted as getting lost, getting drunk, falling asleep, or otherwise fumbling at a critical moment, thus causing a crisis. Vampirella is deeply loyal to him, however; he is the only real family she has.

 Conrad van Helsing
A blind, psychic vampire hunter. He was pursuing Dracula and initially tried to destroy Vampirella, believing her to be kin to that vampire lord.

 Adam van Helsing
Conrad's son, and the last of a long line of vampire hunters, he followed his father's steps and became a paranormal researcher. He is portrayed as more open-minded than his father. He believed Vampirella was not evil, and eventually they fell in love. Vampirella has often helped Adam in his research.

Other characters
 Tyler Westron
A physician who rescued Vampirella after a plane crash. Due to the injuries she sustained, he had to amputate her wings and was able to create a substitute blood serum that keeps Vampirella's thirst under control.

Dracula
Dracula appears as the most frequently recurring villain of the series.

 The Blood-Red Queen of Hearts
Formerly known as Jezebel, or the Whore of Babylon, she was once a beautiful woman of ancient Babylon. She served as high priestess of the mad-god Chaos, until she offended her master by demanding that he make her his queen. As punishment, Chaos destroyed her body and trapped her soul within a Queen of Hearts playing card. Though she no longer has a physical form of her own, she has continued to exist for thousands of years as the card. Whenever a woman touches the card, she becomes the Queen.

 Madek and Magdalene
Evil brother and sister of Vampirella, who planted false memories of the planet Drakulon in Vampirella's mind, in one version of her origin.

 Draculina, Vampirella's blonde twin sister, who first appeared in Vampirella #2 (1969). She would make sporadic appearances in Harris publications, such as in Vampirella Quarterly Summer 2008. She began appearing in Dynamite stories  in 2015.
Nuberus
The demon who tempted Vampirella with her true origin in order to gain access to Earth.
 Sofia Murray
A young punk girl rescued by Vampirella who becomes her sidekick in the first Dynamite series.

 Von Kreist
A former Prussian World War I officer, now a lich, who won his state of immortality in a card game with Satan, but at the price of steadily decaying alive. A cruel and sadistic mastermind, with a special victim preference in children.
Chaos
The ruler of Hell and the master of most of the villains that Vampirella faces.
 Mistress Nyx
The daughter of a liaison between the mad-god Chaos and Lucrezia Borgia. A demonic persona, who is bent on destroying Vampirella.

 Dixie Fattoni
One of two daughters of a Mafioso boss whom she was forced to kill by von Kreist; her twin sister Pixie was turned into a vampire by von Kreist's minions. Vampirella took the orphaned girl under her wing and trained her in combating vampires.

 Pantha
Initially, alien shapeshifter from Vampirella's native planet who can morph into a black panther. Later stories rewrote her origin to that of an ancient Egyptian  Pharaoh that was cursed by the Egyptian gods because of a murderous spree . She is cursed to live forever, with periods where she does not know who or what she is.
 Lilith
Vampirella's mother and the first woman created by God. Her story is told in the alternate version of the events of Genesis, she was the first wife of Adam, and the mother of demons. She sent her daughter to Earth to atone for her mistakes. In Priest's run she no longer is the first woman but a woman from the Planet Drakulon.
 Tristan
 Vampirella's boyfriend on Drakulon in the Warren series who was killed by astronauts from Earth. In the 2010 Dynamite series, he is Vampirella's boyfriend and a werewolf.

Reception
Vampirella was ranked 35th in Comics Buyer's Guide's "100 Sexiest Women in Comics" list.

Circulation figures
From annual required Statement of Circulation. "Copies printed" refers to total print run. "Total paid circulation" refers to number of copies actually sold, which is the above number minus returns, lost/damaged copies, and free/promotional copies.

Vampirella (Warren)

Comics bibliography

Spinoff bibliography

Other versions

Vampi
In 2000 a comic book series entitled Vampi began circulation through Anarchy Studio. The series followed Vampi, an alternate futuristic version of Vampirella that seeks to find a cure for her vampirism. The main series ran for 25 issues. Several miniseries followed under the titles Vampi Vicious, Vampi Vicious Circle, Vampi Vicious Rampage, and Vampi vs. Xin. An omnibus edition collecting the first eighteen issues of the initial run was released in 2012 through Dynamite Entertainment.

Li'l Vampi
In January 2014 Dynamite Entertainment released Li'l Vampi, a one-shot comic book by writer Eric Trautmann and artist Agnes Garbowska. The comic followed a child version of Vampirella as she tries to uncover why monsters are destroying the town of Stoker, Maine.

Media adaptations 
In 1996, a Vampirella film adaptation was produced by Concorde Pictures, starring Talisa Soto in the title role. In 2021, Dynamite Entertainment announced a new feature film was in development, in addition to plans for television adaptations based on the Vampirella Universe.

References

Further reading
 The Spectacular Sisterhood of Superwomen: Awesome Female Characters from Comic Book History by Hope Nicholson, Quirk Books (2017)

External links
 
 
 "Jim Warren Meets Vampirella" Philadelphia City Paper, January 6–12, 2005
 Vampirella at Don Markstein's Toonopedia. Archived from the original on July 19, 2015.

Comics by Archie Goodwin (comics)
Comics by Don McGregor
Comics by Michael Fleisher
Dynamite Entertainment characters
Fictional vampires
Comics characters introduced in 1969
Comics characters who can move at superhuman speeds
Comics characters with accelerated healing
Comics characters with superhuman strength
Mascots introduced in 1969
1969 comics debuts
Horror comics
Fantasy comics
Science fiction comics
Horror fiction magazines
Fantasy fiction magazines
Harris Publications titles
Warren Publishing titles
Vampires in comics
Extraterrestrial superheroes
Fictional bisexual females
Female characters in comics
Female characters in advertising
Female superheroes
LGBT characters in comics
Comics magazines published in Italy
Magazine mascots
Comics about women
Fictional characters with immortality
Fictional hypnotists and indoctrinators
Fictional mass murderers
Comics characters with superhuman senses
Fictional half-demons
Fictional women soldiers and warriors
Shapeshifter characters in comics
Lilith